The 2003 Colonial Athletic Association baseball tournament was held at Coy Tillett Sr. Memorial Field in Manteo, North Carolina, from May 21 through 25.  The event determined the champion of the Colonial Athletic Association for the 2003 season.  Top-seeded  won the tournament for the second time and earned the CAA's automatic bid to the 2003 NCAA Division I baseball tournament.

Entering the event, former member East Carolina had won the most championships, with seven.  Among active members, Old Dominion led with three titles while George Mason had won twice and VCU and William & Mary had each won once.

Format and seeding
The CAA's two division winners received the top two seeds.  The next four teams, regardless of division, were selected and seeded by conference winning percentage.  They played a double-elimination tournament.

Bracket and results

All-Tournament Team
The following players were named to the All-Tournament Team.

Most Valuable Player
Matt Prendergast was named Tournament Most Valuable Player.  Prendergast was a pitcher for VCU.

References

Tournament
Colonial Athletic Association Baseball Tournament
Colonial Athletic Association baseball tournament
Colonial Athletic Association baseball tournament
Baseball in North Carolina
College sports in North Carolina
Sports competitions in North Carolina
Tourist attractions in Dare County, North Carolina